Towards the Light is a 1918 British silent drama film directed by Henry Edwards and starring Edwards, Chrissie White and A.V. Bramble.

Cast
 Henry Edwards - Surly
 Chrissie White - Annie Wilton
 A.V. Bramble - Convict
 Marsh Allen - Rex Richards
 Henry Vibart - Reverend Thorne
 George Traill - Neighbour
 John MacAndrews - Villager

References

External links

1918 films
British silent feature films
1918 drama films
1910s English-language films
Films directed by Henry Edwards
British drama films
Hepworth Pictures films
British black-and-white films
1910s British films
Silent drama films